The Catholic Church of Lhasa Also called the Lhasa Chapel, was the first Catholic church in Tibet in China. It was founded in 1726 and disappeared in 1745.

History 
Three Capuchin missionaries arrived Lhasa in 1708 and were later joined by another two missionaries the next year. The missionaries spent the next few years studying the Tibetan language and providing medical services to the locals. However, in 1712 they returned back to Europe as they were suffering from illness, a lack of funds and faced hostility from the Gelugpa order.

Italian Capuchin priests Francesco della Penna and Domenico da Fano arrived in Lhasa in 1719 with some Capuchin friars. This was followed by a contest of competition with the Jesuit missionary Ippolito Desideri, the Holy See decided in 1721 in favor of the Capuchins who had already obtained the authorization of the Tibetan authorities to build a chapel.

Kelzang Gyatso, the seventh Dalai Lama, authorized the construction of the church on the heights of the city in 1726.

The superior of the mission, Francesco della Penna, returned to Rome in 1737, when Pope Benedict XIV gave a letter to the seventh Dalai Lama, and he took the road to Tibet.

The mission soon began making converts which was met with hostility from the Gelugpa Lamas. Hundreds of Lamas appealed to the Lhasa government to banish the European missionaries. The appeal was successful and all missionaries forcefully left Lhasa by 1745. The church was subsequently destroyed.

The mission had little success converting any Tibetans and most converts were foreign Nepalis, Kasmiris and Han Chinese who resided in Lhasa. However, the mission had up to 26 Tibetan converts near the end of its existence.

See also
Catholic Church of Yerkalo
Christianity in Tibet
History of European exploration in Tibet

References

Buildings and structures in Lhasa
Roman Catholic churches in Tibet
Roman Catholic chapels in China